Edwin C. Stewart (March 8, 1864 in Newfield, Tompkins County, New York – June 15, 1921) was an American politician from New York.

Life
He was the son of David B. Stewart (1832–1915), the first Mayor of Ithaca. He attended the public schools in Ithaca, and then became a partner in his father's wholesale grocery business.

Stewart was a member of the New York State Assembly (Tompkins Co.) in 1894 and 1895.

He was a member of the New York State Senate (40th D.) from 1896 to 1898, and from 1901 to 1904; sitting in the 119th, 120th, 121st, 124th, 125th, 126th and 127th New York State Legislatures.

He was Mayor of Ithaca from 1920 until his death on June 15, 1921. His widow died about half a year later, and the estate became a party in a case argued before the U.S. Supreme Court concerning the payment of estate taxes.

Stewart Park in Ithaca was named in his honor.

Sources
 The New York Red Book compiled by Edgar L. Murlin (published by James B. Lyon, Albany NY, 1897; pg. 170, 404 and 511f)
 Sketches of the members of the Legislature in The Evening Journal Almanac (1895; pg. 63)
 Obituary Notes; DAVID B. STEWART died... in NYT on October 29, 1915
 Stewart family bios transcribed from Landmarks of Tompkins County by John H. Selkreg (1894)

External links
 Ithaca Trust Co. v. United States - 279 U.S. 151 (1929)

1864 births
1921 deaths
Republican Party New York (state) state senators
Mayors of Ithaca, New York
Republican Party members of the New York State Assembly